Monument to Humanity was a nearly completed statue in Kars, Turkey. Visible from neighboring Armenia, the statue depicted two halves of a man, each reaching to hold the other’s hand. The monument was demolished in April 2011, only months after being criticized by then–prime minister Recep Tayyip Erdoğan as a "freak" or "monstrosity".

Background
The statue was commissioned by the Kars municipality as a gesture of reconciliation in Armenia–Turkey relations following the Zurich Protocols, a 2009 accord to establish formal diplomatic recognition between the two countries. Then–mayor of Kars, referred to the statue as "his dream," that would help bring together the "brothers and sisters" of the two nations.

However, the statue was also criticized, because it was erected without any consultation with the Armenian community, and represented a one-sided imposition rather than "reconciliation". Egemen Özbek writes:

Demolition
Turkish Prime Minister Recep Tayyip Erdoğan described the monument as a "freak" or a "monstrosity" during a visit to Kars on 8 January 2011. In spite of protests, the city authority decided to remove the statue.

On 26 April 2011, demolition began with the dismounting of the sculpture's two heads, which Armenian sources considered effectively a decapitation. Aksoy also said "I felt as if my children were being beheaded." An official statement by the demolition company stated: "In order to dismantle it, first the head will be cut off and taken down with the help of a crane. Then, in the following ten days, the statue will be dismembered into 20 pieces." The demolition was completed on 14 June 2011.

While Erdoğan insisted that this was merely a question of aesthetics, international observers believed the demolition an attempt to appeal to nationalist sentiment ahead of the 2011 general election, concurring with Aksoy, who said Erdoğan was "maneuvering to consolidate his reactionary base in the run-up to elections," and that he "bagged the vote of local Azeris," who denounced extending a hand to Armenia.

Aftermath
As a response to Erdoğan's comments, Aksoy filed a lawsuit against Erdoğan for insulting him. Erdoğan's lawyer claimed it was a critique rather than an insult, but on 3 March 2015, an Istanbul court fined Erdoğan 10,000 Turkish lira for the insult, a ruling that was termed "a refreshing move by the Turkish judiciary" by oppositional commentator Sibel Hürtaş. Aksoy announced he would spend the money for a Nevruz Day party with his friends, thereby directing haram (Arabic for "immoral") money to its adequately haram purpose. In July 2019, the Constitutional Court ruled that its demolition violated Aksoy's freedom of expression and that he shall be compensated.

References

Literature

External links
Image gallery at Hürriyet

2009 sculptures
Buildings and structures demolished in 2011
Armenian genocide commemoration
Armenia–Turkey relations
Humanity, Statue Of
Humanity, Statue Of
Humanity, Statue Of
Humanity, Statue Of
Humanity, Statue Of
Humanity, Statue Of
Humanity, Statue Of
Humanity, Statue Of
Humanity, Statue Of
Recep Tayyip Erdoğan controversies
Humanity, Statue Of